John Alfred Stoddard Nash, Baron Nash (born 22 March 1949) is a British former businessman, also formerly a Conservative Parliamentary Under Secretary of State for Schools. Nash was chair of the British Venture Capital Association (1988–89) and on the board of the Conservative think-tank, the Centre for Policy Studies. With his wife, Caroline Nash, he founded the charity Future, which was established Future Academies, a trust managing school academies; he is joint chairman of the governors of Pimlico Academy, one of the institutions run by Future Academies.

Education
John Nash was educated at Milton Abbey School, a boarding independent school in the village of Milton Abbas (near Blandford Forum) in Dorset, followed by Corpus Christi College at the University of Oxford, where he read Law, and obtained an M.A.

Career
After reading Law at Corpus Christi College, Oxford, Nash became a barrister before moving into finance. Nash was Assistant Director of Lazard Brothers and Co Ltd (1975–1983) before moving to private equity firm Advent Limited, becoming its managing director in 1986. He was co-founder of private equity firm Sovereign Capital, as well as being chair of the British Venture Capital Association from 1988 to 1989. He is also the former chairman of one of the biggest contractors to the NHS, Care UK. In January 2013 Nash left Sovereign Capital to pursue his political interests.

Political career
In January 2013 Lord Nash was appointed as schools minister. He became a life peer as Baron Nash, of Ewelme in the County of Oxfordshire on 21 January 2013. He and his wife have donated almost £300,000 to the Conservative Party and according to the Telegraph, the appointment raises concern about a potential conflict of interest and appointment of donors though the Department for Education said he would not make business decisions whilst in office.

In April 2013, Labour councillors called for an inquiry after the new Pimlico primary school, where Nash was co-chairman of the governors, appointed an unqualified teacher as headmistress ahead of its opening in September. Further criticism followed when she resigned after four weeks in the job. Also in October 2013, a second headteacher, the acting head of nearby Churchill Gardens academy, was allegedly forced from her position following bullying by Future Academies managers. In 2016, the National Union of Teachers cited Future Academies after the Nashes' daughter Jo, unqualified as a teacher, was given an unpaid teaching position at the trust's Pimlico Academy. Future Academies has faced repeated criticism from teachers and parents regarding its governance and curriculum.

In March 2014, the Conservative minister rejected the council bid for Holborn and St Pancras building a post-comprehensive school, called a "university training school", but promised only to build them in Cambridge and Birmingham.

In October 2016, following a backlash from schools and parents and the national boycott of the school census expansion, he wrote that newly collected pupils' nationality and country of birth data would not be included in the National Pupil Database (NPD). In a letter to peers seen by Schools Week, Nash defended the sharing of pupil address and school data with the Home Office, but admitted the new information called for a different approach, saying, "given the sensitivity of the new information being collected we will not add this to the NPD, so no-one outside the department will be able to access it." Members of the House of Lords went on to oppose the law change in a debate and motion-of-regret, which was tabled by the Liberal Democrat education spokesperson Lord Storey. On 31 October 2016 the House of Lords agreed after debate, with the regret motion on the expansion of the collection of pupil data: "That this House regrets that information about pupils' nationality and country of birth collected under the Education (Pupil Information) (England) (Miscellaneous Amendments) Regulations 2016 (Statutory Instrument 2016/808)[3] could be used to help determine a child’s immigration status".

Lord Nash resigned from government on 28 September 2017 and was replaced by Sir Theodore Agnew DL as an unpaid Parliamentary Under Secretary of State at the Department for Education.

References

1949 births
Alumni of Corpus Christi College, Oxford
Conservative Party (UK) life peers
Living people
People educated at Milton Abbey School
Businesspeople in the health care industry
Life peers created by Elizabeth II